Puschel or Püschel is a surname. Notable people with the surname include:

Dieter Puschel (1939–1992), German racing cyclist
Karin Püschel (born 1958), German former volleyball player 
Konrad Püschel (1907–1997), German architect, town planner, academic and former Bauhaus student
Ursula Püschel (1930–2018), German literary critic.